Jiménez is a canton in the Cartago province of Costa Rica. The head city is in Juan Viñas district.

History 
Jiménez was created on 19 August 1903 by decree 84.

Geography 
Jiménez has an area of  km² and a mean elevation of  metres.

The Turrialba River forms the northern boundary of the canton of Jiménez, with the Reventazón River and Atirro River establishing the eastern border and the Pejibaye River delineating a major portion of the canton's border on the west.

Districts 
The canton of Jiménez is subdivided into the following districts:
 Juan Viñas
 Tucurrique
 Pejibaye
 La Victoria

Demographics 

For the 2011 census, Jiménez had a population of  inhabitants.

Transportation

Road transportation 
The canton is covered by the following road routes:

Economy
Its main economic activity is the sugar cane plantations operated by the Ingenio Juan Viñas, which factory produces more than 20,000 tons of sugar annually.

References 

Cantons of Cartago Province
Populated places in Cartago Province